Evermore (stylized in all lowercase) is the ninth studio album by American singer-songwriter Taylor Swift. It was a surprise album released on December 11, 2020, via Republic Records, less than five months after Folklore, her eighth studio album. Evermore was a spontaneous product of Swift's extended collaboration with her Folklore collaborator Aaron Dessner, mainly recorded at his Long Pond Studio in the Hudson Valley.

Swift described Evermore as an offshoot of "the folklorian woods"—an escapist, cottagecore-inspired direction she first ideated with Folklore during the COVID-19 pandemic; she regards them as sister albums. Evermore blends alternative rock, indie folk and chamber pop styles, carried by fingerpicked guitars, somber pianos, lavish strings, and sparse percussion. Impressionist storytelling and mythopoeia dominate its lyrical technique. The subject matter has been described as an anthology of tales about love, marriage, infidelity, and grief, exploring the complexities of human emotion. American bands Bon Iver, Haim, and the National appear as guest performers on the album.

Earning widespread acclaim from critics, Evermore was praised for its character studies, experimental production, and Swift's nuanced vocals. Reviews regarded the album a sequel or a counterpart to Folklore, and various publications listed it in their 2020 year-end rankings. Evermore was nominated for Album of the Year at the 64th Annual Grammy Awards, a second consecutive nomination for Swift in the category after winning it with Folklore the previous year. Dessner and Long Pond have achieved mainstream notability since Evermore release. 

The album reached number one in Argentina, Australia, Belgium, Canada, Croatia, Greece, New Zealand, Portugal, the United Kingdom, and the United States. Republic Records reported over a million copies of Evermore sold in its first week globally. It was Swift's eighth consecutive Billboard 200 number-one debut, spending four weeks atop the chart, and achieved various chart feats in Australia, the UK and the US; in the latter, the tracks "Willow", "No Body, No Crime", and "Coney Island" impacted pop, country, and alternative radio stations, respectively. "Willow" became Swift's seventh Billboard Hot 100 number-one song and her second in 2020 after "Cardigan", making her the first ever act to simultaneously debut atop both Billboard 200 and Hot 100 charts two times. Evermore was 2021's best-selling alternative music album and Americana album in the US and the UK, respectively.

Background and conception 
During the COVID-19 lockdowns, on July 23, 2020, American singer-songwriter Taylor Swift announced her eighth studio album and first surprise album, Folklore, and released it the next day. Produced by herself, first-time collaborator Aaron Dessner, long-time collaborator Jack Antonoff, and boyfriend Joe Alwyn, the album was a critical and commercial success, becoming the best-selling album of 2020 and winning Album of the Year at the 63rd Annual Grammy Awards. On November 25, 2020, a concert documentary titled Folklore: The Long Pond Studio Sessions, shot at Dessner's Long Pond Studio in Hudson Valley, was released to Disney+. It detailed the making of Folklore with performances of its songs.

After releasing Folklore, Swift continued to work remotely with Dessner, who would send her instrumental tracks, to which she would write the lyrics. She stated the rave reception of Folklore further encouraged her to experiment further with its musical style. Soon after, Swift's sessions with Dessner resulted in a project that was a natural extension of Folklore, which eventually assumed its individual identity as Evermore. Dessner dubbed Evermore a "weird avalanche" effecting from Folklore. In comparison to its predecessor, the development of Evermore was a more experimental process, during which the duo did not subject themselves to any limitations. In an Apple Music interview to Zane Lowe, Swift stated Evermore gave her a feeling of "quiet conclusion and sort of this weird serenity" after putting out Folklore, and correlated it with the themes of those albums, saying one of Folklore main tropes was "conflict resolution"—"trying to figure out how to get through something with someone", whereas Evermore deals with "endings of all sorts, sizes and shapes", and the pain and various phases of those closures.

On December 10, 2020, three days prior to her 31st birthday, Swift posted nine photos on Instagram, which together formed an image depicting the singer's back, with her hair in a braid and facing a forest. In another post across her social media, she announced her ninth studio album, titled Evermore, releasing at midnight. She revealed the track-list, and a music video for its opening track, "Willow", which would premiere on YouTube alongside the album release. Referring to lockdown regulations in light of the COVID-19 pandemic, Swift wrote: "You've all been so caring, supportive and thoughtful on my birthdays and so this time I thought I would give you something! I also know this holiday season will be a lonely one for most of us and if there are any of you out there who turn to music to cope with missing loved ones the way I do, this is for you". Prior to the "Willow" music video premiere, Swift said she likens Evermore to fall and winter, in contrast to its predecessor's spring and summer.

Writing and recording 

Like its predecessor, Evermore is also a product of remote collaboration and virtual communication, and was recorded in total secrecy. Dessner produced or co-produced all of the tracks except "Gold Rush", which Swift and Antonoff produced. All of the tracks, except "Cowboy like Me", were recorded at Long Pond Studio, when Folklore: The Long Pond Studio Sessions was shot.

After the release of Folklore, Swift wrote two songs, "Closure" and "Dorothea", for Big Red Machine, which is a supergroup by Dessner and Justin Vernon, the frontman of American indie folk band Bon Iver; the songs ended up on Evermore instead. To celebrate Folklore, Dessner casually composed an instrumental track "Westerly", named after the location of Swift's Rhode Island home. An hour later, Swift wrote "Willow" to the track and sent it back to him. She wrote the title track "Evermore" with Alwyn (alias William Bowery) and sent it to Vernon, who added a bridge. Dessner realized they were creating a counterpart to Folklore only after the duo wrote more than seven songs. He composed "Tolerate It" on a piano in  time signature and sent it to Swift, conjuring a scene in her mind upon hearing the track; she sent it back with finished lyrics. Dessner stated he "cried when [he] first heard" its lyrics.

Swift traveled to Long Pond Studio to film Folklore: The Long Pond Studio Sessions. Once filming was complete, Swift stayed at Long Pond overnight, to record with Dessner and Antonoff. The next morning, she approached Dessner in his kitchen with "'Tis the Damn Season", which she wrote during the night. Dessner cited the song as one of his favorite works ever, and that it could have just remained as an instrumental, but instead, Swift's "incredible storytelling ability and musical ability took it and made something much great". "No Body, No Crime" was inspired by Swift's "obsession with true crime podcasts/documentaries". She wrote the song on a rubber-bridge guitar and mailed Dessner a voice memo, after which he started producing it. Swift had specific ideas on how she wanted the song, including a guest feature from American pop rock band Haim, who recorded their vocals at Ariel Rechtshaid's Los Angeles home and forwarded it to Swift. The song's harmonica and guitar riffs were played by Josh Kaufman, who also played the harmonica on "Betty" from Folklore; JT Bates played the drums, and also did the same on "Dorothea".

Aaron Dessner and his twin brother, Bryce Dessner, sent Swift some of the instrumentals they made for their band, American indie rock band the National. One of those was what would become "Coney Island". Swift and Alwyn wrote its lyrics, and recorded it with her vocals. After listening to the demo, the Dessner brothers felt that the song was very related to the National, and envisioned Matt Berninger (the band's lead vocalist) singing it, and Bryan Devendorf (the drummer) drumming it. Aaron Dessner informed Berninger, who was "excited" for the idea. The band assembled, Devendorf played the drums, while his brother Scott Devendorf played the bass and pocket piano; Bryce Dessner helped produce the song.

"Marjorie" was an instrumental precursor to "Peace", the fifteenth track on Folklore. The latter's drone is present in the former's bridge.  The backing rhythm of "Marjorie" was composed with an Allovers Hi-hat Generator, a software developed by producer Ryan Olson, which had been used in many Big Red Machine songs. The instrument takes any sound and splits them into samples, and regenerates them in randomized musical patterns. Dessner went through the patterns, picked his favorite parts, looped them, developed them into an instrumental, and sent it to Swift, who wrote "Marjorie" to it, a song about her maternal grandmother and opera singer, Marjorie Finlay. She also sent a folder of Finlay's opera records to Dessner, who sampled some of it on the song. "Right Where You Left Me" and "Happiness" were written days before Evermore was finished. Dessner had been working on the composition of "Happiness" since 2019, thinking it would be a Big Red Machine song; Swift, however, admired its instrumentals and ended up finishing its lyrics, which was also the case with "Right Where You Left Me". The last few weeks of recording Evermore overlapped with the recording of Fearless (Taylor's Version)—Swift's first re-recorded album; she recorded "Happiness" and "You Belong with Me (Taylor's Version)" on the same day.

Vernon was more involved in Evermore than Folklore. He played the drums on "Cowboy like Me" and "Closure", guitar and banjo on "Ivy", and contributed backing vocals in "Marjorie". For "Closure", he processed Swift's vocals through his Messina vocal modifier, which distorted her soft timbre into a robotic growl. "Cowboy like Me" was recorded at Scarlet Pimpernel Studios, located in the UK, owned by Marcus Mumford, the lead singer of English folk rock band Mumford & Sons; Mumford provided backing vocals on the song. In "Ivy", Dessner added sleigh bells to invoke winter-oriented emotions, coinciding with the song's wintry imagery. He intentionally added "a wintry nostalgia" to most of the music in Evermore, leaning towards the idea Swift told him. Dessner said mixing the album's 17 songs was a "Herculean task" and that the sound engineer Jon Low thought it would not be finished on time.

Music and lyrics 

The standard edition of Evermore is one hour long, consisting of 15 tracks, while the deluxe adds two bonus songs. Haim, the National and Bon Iver provide guest vocals on "No Body, No Crime", "Coney Island", and "Evermore", respectively. Critics have dubbed Evermore a sequel and a companion record to Folklore.

Composition 
Evermore is an indie folk, folk-pop, alternative rock, and chamber rock record with country influences. It has its predecessor's minimal and lo-fi styles, but looser and more experimental in nature. The album is characterized by its acoustic core and wintry mood, consisting of sparse arrangements, slow-burning melodies, burbling, fingerpicked acoustic guitars, swaying electric guitars, soft, smooth, and somber pianos, warm and woozy synthesizers, mandolin, twangy banjos, throbbing drum machines, lush strings, electronic thrums, subtle layers of Mellotrons, flute, French horn, and cellos. Swift's mellifluous vocals are backed by gauzy harmonies and "misty atmospherics".

Rolling Stone wrote that Evermore deepens Swift's goth-folk vision. Hits described the album's sonic palette as "watery" and "hypnotic". The Daily Telegraph said that there is no sense of tempo or urgency in its songs, departing from the stadium-suited tempos of Swift's earlier works. Esquire noted Evermore focus on "sonic details and nuances rather than big hooks." According to critic Tom Hull, while Swift remains attentive to "production details", Evermore follows Folklore in abandoning "pop glitz" in favor of "straightforward songcraft" due in part to the pandemic shifting Swift's focus from arenas to homely settings. Stereogum described it as "a soft, meditative, consciously quiet" album of "restorative old-school singer-songwriter music". In Slate opinion, Evermore has a more spacious ambience with lots of break, unlike the "maximalist-minimalism" of Folklore, which had "layers upon layers of restrained instrumental lines".

Themes 
Evermore is an intimate album heavily rooted in elaborate first-person storytelling from third-person perspectives, character studies, and narrative mythmaking. It ventures deeper inside the imaginary world Swift built with Folklore, blending facts and fiction. Both albums share a common escapist concept, but in contrast to Folklores more introspective and romantic nature, Evermore is bolder, uninhibited, playful, and impressionistic, delving extensively into Swift's ideas of adult love and pain. The songs generally ruminate themes of forbidden love, romantic neglect, forgiveness, marriage, and infidelity, revolving around a set of unique characters, such as embattled couples, scorned friends, and complicated women. Evermore also analyses conflicted emotions and possibilities, aside "noirish twists" in plots.

Like its sister album, Evermore lyrically incorporates nature, landscapes and objects in the sky, such as crescent moon, sunrise, comets, amber skies, precipice, willow, clover and ivy. Swift's trademark turns of phrase and wordplay are also abundant. Variety observed that "warmth amid iciness" is a "recurring lyrical motif". American Songwriter opined that Evermore has Swift mostly writing "the 'unhappily ever after' anthology of marriages gone bad". Slate also called it an anthology, emphasizing "her leap away from autobiography into songs that are either pure fictions or else lyrically symbolic in ways that don't act as romans à clef". Stereogum labeled the album "observational fiction". Pitchfork noted that Swift remains a versatile, expressive vocalist, and a "wordy" lyricist to "magnify sad, small moments." Music theory professor Alyssa Barna said Swift adopts a static, colorless timbre for both vocals and instrumentation in the album. Spin remarked the "exceedingly complex human emotions" she unravels in Evermore with "precision and devastation".

Songs 
Evermore opens with "Willow", a chamber folk love song propelled by picked guitars, glockenspiel, orchestrations, programmed drums, and a "breathless chorus". "Champagne Problems" is a mournful ballad with spacious, oompah piano chords entwining with a guitar arpeggio and choir vocals. It depicts a struggling girlfriend whose mental issues disrupt her romantic relationship, leading her to turn down her lover's proposal. "Gold Rush" is a nimble chamber pop song with drums, horns, violins, swiveling shifts in tempo, and a "dreamy" chorus. Its frenzy verses are couplets delivered in a pulsating rhythm over persistent beats, with a red herring in its intro and outro made of "layered vocals". Expressing jealousy and insecurity towards an attractive subject, "Gold Rush" limns the narrator's infatuation for the subject using a daydream, and depicts her distaste at her own incapacitation in the face of beauty, comparing it to gold rushes.

The fourth track, "Tis the Damn Season", is a Christmas song. It sees a female narrator arrive for her holidays at hometown Tupelo, where she encounters her former lover and ends up in bed with him despite knowing the rekindled flame will not lead anywhere. It is built around an electric guitar riff, and the narrator is revealed to be a character named Dorothea, later in the album. "Tolerate It" recounts a young woman in an age-gap relationship, and depicts her internal agony and resentment towards her aloof, unappreciative partner. It is a slow-building ballad guided by a "muffled" piano and tense synth-beats. Its plot was inspired by Rebecca, the 1939 novel by English author Daphne du Maurier. "No Body, No Crime" opens with police sirens. It is a "twangy", cinematic, country, pop rock, and country rock song, featuring Haim's harmonies. It tells a "macabre revenge tale" of a woman named Este murdered by her husband in favor of his mistress. The narrator is a friend of Este and takes revenge by murdering the unfaithful man.

"Happiness", the melancholic seventh track, is an ambient ballad driven by "hazy" synthesizers, hi-hats, violin, bass, organs, piano and drone. The song channels a stream of consciousness, in which the narrator empathizes with the subject after their divorce, contemplates the split, and apologizes for "losing track of the facts", and affirms happiness will be found again. It contains references to The Great Gatsby. "Dorothea" is an Americana song from the perspective of the male subject in "'Tis the Damn Season", who stays in Tupelo while his high-school lover, Dorothea, moves to Los Angeles for a Hollywood career. He narrate his stories of her, such as a skipped prom and feelings of separation, and yearns for Dorothea's return to the simple rural life, over a honky-tonk piano, tambourine and guitars. It has been compared to "Betty" due to their similar perspectives.

The ninth track, "Coney Island", is an alternative rock, waltz and indie-folk duet with Matt Berninger of the National. The song depicts suburban nostalgia and recollects a couple's memories in Coney Island; Swift's melodious vocals contrast Berninger's mumbled baritone. "Ivy" is a folk song with "elastic vocals" and a "jaunty chorus", documenting a married woman's infidelity, over a ticking arrangement of banjo, picked guitar, trumpet, and Vernon's gentle harmonies. It conveys her temptation for her secret lover and the realistic consequences that may hinder their affair, using a metaphor of ivy vines growing over a stone house to represent her deep-rooted attachment.

Swift sings about two "gold-digging" con artists in the eleventh track, "Cowboy like Me", who unexpectedly fall in love with each other while frequenting resorts and deceiving rich people. It is an alternative, country, folk rock, and blues tune, with hushed guitars, harmonica riff, mandolin, piano, lap steel, and Mumford's backing vocals. "Long Story Short" is a pop-infused indie rock song with a rousing post-chorus hook, explosive guitars, strings, crisp beats of live drums and drum machine. Swift retreads Reputation (2017) in the song, summarizing her life's worse moments and emotional healing. "Marjorie" details Swift's grief over her grandmother Finlay, who died when Swift was 13 years old. Its lyrics consist of Finlay's advices to her granddaughter, as well as Swift's memories and regrets. Its gentle production samples Finlay's soprano vocals over "buzzing" synths, pizzicato strings, drone, pulse, cello, and a "pulsing keyboard arrangement".

"Closure", the fourteenth track, is Swift's kiss-off to the song's unnamed subject, a reply to their "self-serving" request, insincere kindness, and pretentious amity. It is an electroacoustic, industrial folk song characterized by an unusual  time signature, and a "skittering" production of brass, piano, to-and-fro strings, electronic creaks, "clattering percussion", and synth drums. The album ends with the title track—a piano ballad that progresses into a dramatic bridge after a tempo shift, where Swift is joined midway by Vernon's signature falsetto in a call and response. Swift navigates depression, desolation and negative notions in her verses, in contrast to Vernon's optimistic and supportive verses that attempt to help her, resulting in a realization that pain is temporary. The deluxe edition of Evermore includes two bonus tracks: "Right Where You Left Me" is a country and folk-pop song, portraying the fate of a love "frozen in time", over twangy guitars. In contrast, "It's Time to Go" is about the narrator's knowledge of when to exit a relationship, such as a friendship, featuring tales of divorce and losing a dream career to an unfit individual; the song contains references to Swift's dispute over her masters.

Art direction 
 
The visual aesthetic of Evermore takes upon a wintry theme, a yuletide version of the cottagecore, woodland aesthetic of Folklore. Time stated that Folklore is a muted, autumnal palette of sounds and feelings, whereas Evermore is its winter companion with lingering sadness and regret. While Folklore adapts a grayscale monochrome, Evermore employs colors. The Times of India opined that Evermore embraces "1960s-era Laurel Canyon".

Cover artwork 
The cover artwork of Evermore shows Swift in a barren field, facing away from the camera, looking over the bare trees in the distance. She is seen standing at the edge of a forested area, while on the cover of Folklore, she was seen inside a forest. Her hair is styled in a French braid and she wears a single-breasted, brown and orange checked flannel coat, taken from a collection by English designer Stella McCartney. Stylist called the hairstyle "messy-yet-chic". Adam Reed, UK editorial ambassador for French beauty company L'Oréal, admired Swift's braid and described it as "simple, supernatural and timeless". According to Consequence, the cover artwork is "gorgeous in its simplicity", and has Swift facing a field, insinuating "she's inviting the listener to see the field through her eyes." Following Evermore release, replicas of the flannel coat Swift wore on the cover artwork quickly sold out on Farfetch. The album cover was the third most-searched album cover of 2021 on the internet, after Kanye West's Donda (2021) and Olivia Rodrigo's Sour (2021).

Release and promotion 
Evermore was released on December 11, 2020, two days before Swift's 31st birthday, to digital music and streaming platforms only. It is a "sister album" to Folklore, which was launched less five months prior; both of them are surprise albums announced 16 hours prior to their midnight releases. Evermore marked the second time Swift abandoned her long, traditional album rollout.

The CDs were released on December 18, 2020. The bonus tracks of Evermore deluxe edition, "Right Where You Left Me" and "It's Time to Go", which were formerly physical-exclusive, were released to streaming services on January 7, 2021. Cassette tapes and vinyl LPs of Evermore were released on February 21, and May 28, 2021, respectively. Billboard reported that the delayed release of the album's physical formats is owed to its surprise release and the time-consuming manufacturing process of physical albums, specifically the vinyl copies. Limited number of autographed CDs were sold at select independent record stores.

On December 14, 2020, Swift appeared on Jimmy Kimmel Live! to promote the album. On a December 2020 episode of Howard Stern's Sirius XM radio show, English singer-songwriter Paul McCartney revealed that Swift originally decided to postpone the release of Evermore by one week to respect the original December 11 release date of his eighteenth studio album, McCartney III; upon learning this, McCartney decided to release his album on December 18 instead so that Swift could move forward with her Evermore rollout as initially planned. Three six-song compilations consisting of tracks from both Evermore and Folklore, titled The Dropped Your Hand While Dancing Chapter, The Forever Is The Sweetest Con Chapter, and The Ladies Lunching Chapter (all stylized in all lowercase), were released to streaming platforms on January 21, January 27, and February 4, 2021, respectively.

Singles 

"Willow" was released as the lead single of Evermore, alongside the album itself, on December 11, 2020. The song was accompanied with a music video directed by Swift. The single debuted at number-one in Australia, Canada and the United States. In the US, it scored her her seventh number-one song, second number-one in 2020 (after "Cardigan"), and the third number-one debut of her career. "Willow" topped Hot Alternative Songs, Adult Top 40 and Digital Song Sales charts as well. According to Billboard, three of the album's tracks were sent to different radio formats—a plan that was adapted for Folklore as well. "Willow" impacted US adult contemporary and pop radio stations on December 14 and 15, 2020, respectively; "No Body, No Crime" was sent to US country radio on January 11, 2021. "Coney Island" was promoted to US adult album alternative radio on January 18, 2021.

Critical reception 

Evermore was met with widespread critical acclaim upon release, with emphasis on its kinship with Folklore and Swift's expansion of her musical boundaries. On Metacritic, which assigns a normalized score out of 100 to ratings from publications, the album received a weighted mean score of 85 based on 29 reviews, indicating "universal acclaim".

Describing Swift as an unrivaled songwriter, Brodie Lancaster of The Sydney Morning Herald found Evermore traveling deeper into the singer's fictitious narratives, and praised the depth and variety of its characters. NME critic Hannah Mylrea opined that Swift pushes her indie reinvention further in Evermore, terming it a "freewheeling younger sibling" while Folklore is the "introspective, romantic older sister"; Mylrea thought Evermore is looser and more experimental, expanding on its predecessor's sonic palette. In congruence, American Songwriter designated Folklore as the "archetypal older sister—a careful, yet hopeless romantic" whereas Evermore is the "bold, scrappy younger one", with the latter being a yuletide evolution of the former's sound. Maura Johnston, writing for Entertainment Weekly, asserted that Swift "levels up" on Evermore by taking musical risks, and dubbed the sister albums a career-high for the singer.

Spin critic Bobby Olivier thought the "career-redefining" album finds Swift at her prime, joining "the pantheon of songwriters who consistently deliver despite unimaginable expectations". He regarded Evermore a stronger work than Folklore. Annie Zaleski of The A.V. Club also chose Evermore over Folklore, and noted that the former continues the latter's "universe-building" with stronger writing and greater sonic cohesion. The Guardian Alexis Petridis said Evermore furthers Swift's departure to alternative rock from mainstream pop, comparing it to her country-to-pop shift in Red (2012); he added that it proves her ability to switch genres easily. Calling it heartfelt and ruminative, Neil McCormick of The Daily Telegraph lauded the album's emotional songcraft and unhurried tempo, noting its songs are not for stadiums. Patrick Ryan of USA Today gave plaudits to its mystical instrumentation and escapist lyrics, stressing that Evermore is not a vestige of Folklore, but rather a sister reinforcing Swift's strengths. In her Rolling Stone review, Claire Shaffer saw Swift embracing new genres and ambitious storytelling, and welcomed her new artistic direction.

The Independent writer Helen Brown deemed its songs haunting and contemplative, and complimented its "tasteful" compositions. Jason Lipshutz of Billboard stated that the album is more progressive and audacious than Folklore, although posing as a sequel at first. He explained that Evermore explores the complications of adult love more extensively than its predecessor, and flaunts Swift's boldest and richest songwriting. Variety critic Chris Willman praised the album's subliminal production and Swift's agile vocals, and underlined its impressionist storytelling style that clicks only after multiple listens. Stereogums Tom Breihan named Evermore a "full-on winter album" populated by "subtle growers" shrouded in a sedative atmosphere. Jon Pareles of The New York Times commended its diligent sound and poised lyrics, and noted more character studies in it than Folklore.

In less favorable reviews, Kitty Empire of The Observer praised the album's emotion and themes, but felt Swift is "still a little muted on Evermore as she was on Folklore by pastel music that smears Vaseline on her otherwise keen lens." Chris Richards of The Washington Post found the album overlong, felt some lyrics were sub-par for Swift's prowess, and rejected the notion of categorizing her 2020 works as indie. Mikael Wood of the Los Angeles Times felt that the album is Folklores leftovers, and "simply repeats its trick", but named "Tolerate It", "Gold Rush", "Champagne Problems", "No Body, No Crime" and "Dorothea" as highlights.

Year-end lists 
By the time Swift unveiled the album, many publications had already issued their year-end rankings of best albums of 2020. Evermore ranked on lists published after December 11, including number-one placements from NJ.com, USA Today, and Variety, which it shared with Folklore. Evermore finished at number 20 on Metacritic's aggregated list of 2020 year-end rankings.

Commercial performance 
Available only via digital music and streaming platforms, Republic Records reported over a million copies of Evermore sold in its first-week worldwide, marking Swift's eighth consecutive studio album to achieve it. All of the album's 15 tracks entered the top 75 of the Billboard Global 200 chart. Aided by Evermore and Folklore, Swift was 2020's top streamed artist on Amazon Music across all genres. The International Federation of the Phonographic Industry (IFPI) named her the best-selling solo artist and female artist of 2020, and second overall.

United States 
Evermore debuted at number one on the Billboard 200 chart, topping it for four weeks. It opened with 329,000 units, consisting of 220.49 million on-demand streams and 154,000 digital albums, and earned the biggest sales week for an album since her own Folklore. It is Swift's second number-one album in 2020 and eighth consecutive number-one debut, making her the third woman with eight number-ones, behind Barbra Streisand (11) and Madonna (9). Alongside Folklore at number three, Swift became the first woman in the chart's history to simultaneously have two albums in the top-three. The gap between the number-one debuts of Folklore and Evermore was 140 days, breaking the Guinness World Record for the shortest gap between two chart-topping albums by a woman on the Billboard 200. The album debuted atop the Alternative Albums chart as well, dethroning Folklore from number one; Evermore topped the chart for 15 weeks.

All of the album's 15 tracks entered the Billboard Hot 100 simultaneously. Evermore became Swift's third album to chart all of its standard tracks together, after Lover (2019) and Folklore. Swift became the woman with the most Hot 100 hits with 128, regaining the record from Nicki Minaj. With the number-one debut of "Willow", she also became first act to simultaneously place an album and a single atop both Billboard 200 and Hot 100 charts at two occasions, following Folklore and "Cardigan". All tracks appeared on Hot Rock & Alternative Songs chart as well, except "No Body, No Crime" which debuted at number two on the Hot Country Songs. Due to eight tracks from Folklore remaining on the chart alongside the 14 from Evermore, Swift occupied 22 of the chart's 50 positions—the second most simultaneous entries in the chart's history, behind Linkin Park (23). On the Hot Alternative Songs, Swift claimed 16 spots, besting Machine Gun Kelly's record.

Despite its availability for the last two weeks of 2020 only, Evermore became one of the top 10 best-selling albums of 2020. It placed eighth on Rolling Stone best-sellers list, and tenth on MRC Data's best selling albums of 2020 with 283,000 sales; its sister record, Folklore, was the top seller of 2020.

In April 2021, Evermore surpassed a million units in the US. In June, it scored its fourth week atop the Billboard 200 with 202,000 units, following its vinyl release. 192,000 of that sum were pure sales, surpassing her own Fearless (Taylor's Version) for the largest sales week of 2021. It marked the 53rd chart-topping week of Swift's career, extending her record as the female act with the most weeks at number one in Billboard 200 history and the third-most overall, behind the Beatles and Elvis Presley. The album sold 102,000 vinyl copies the same week, breaking the former record by Jack White's Lazaretto (40,000) for the biggest sales week for vinyl LPs since MRC Data's inauguration in 1991. Evermore became the best-selling CD and vinyl album of 2021. In July 2021, it became the best-selling album of the year, with 374,000 copies sold; Evermore was the seventh most consumed album with 818,000 total units.

Evermore topped the 2021 Billboard Year-End Top Album Sales and Top Alternative Albums charts. It further placed fourth on the year-end Billboard 200 chart. Swift ranked as the number-one Billboard 200 Artist, Billboard 200 Female Artist, Top Album Sales Artist, Top Alternative Artist, and Top Alternative Albums Artist. Selling 529,000 pure copies, Evermore was sixth on the best-selling albums list of 2021, alongside three other Swift albums—Red (Taylor's Version), Fearless (Taylor's Version), and Folklore—in the top 10.

Other markets 
In Canada, Evermore appeared at the top spot of Billboard Canadian Albums chart as Swift's eighth Canadian number-one album, and her second in 2020. The album spent three weeks atop the chart. All of the tracks debuted inside the top 50 region of the Canadian Hot 100 simultaneously, except "Closure" (number 57); "Willow" became her seventh Canadian number-one hit, with "Champagne Problems" at number six, "No Body, No Crime" at 11, "'Tis the Damn Season" at 13, "Gold Rush" at 14, and "Tolerate It" at 18. In 2021, Evermore was the country's seventh best-selling album.

In Australia, Swift achieved a "Chart Double" by occupying the top spots of both albums and singles charts simultaneously. Evermore entered at number one on the ARIA Albums Chart, garnering her seventh chart-topper. Collecting her second number-one album of the year 19 weeks after Folklore, Swift broke the record for the shortest gap between two successive number-ones, surpassing the 25 weeks between Ariana Grande's Sweetener (2018) and Thank U, Next (2019). "Willow" debuted atop the ARIA Singles Chart, accompanied by 11 fellow tracks. It marked her seventh Australian number-one song. Evermore spent four consecutive weeks at number-one in Australia, tying with Folklore as her second longest-running chart-topper, behind 1989 (11 weeks).

In the United Kingdom, Evermore topped the UK Albums Chart for two weeks. It made Swift the fastest female artist to accumulate six number-one albums in the country (i2012–2020), surpassing Madonna (1997–2008), and the first female artist to score six chart-toppers in the 21st-century. The album is her second number-one album in 2020 after Folklore, establishing her as the first act to score multiple chart-topping albums in a calendar year, since David Bowie in 2016. Evermore also topped the UK's Vinyl Albums chart, and the Americana Albums chart. On the Official Singles Chart, "Willow" landed at number three and gave Swift her eleventh top-five hit, while tracks "Champagne Problems" and "No Body, No Crime" arrived at numbers 15 and 19, respectively, increasing her UK top-20 hits total to 21. Evermore was the best-selling Americana album of 2021 in the UK.

In New Zealand, the album launched atop the Top 40 Albums chart, while its tracks "Willow", "Champagne Problems", "No Body, No Crime" and "Gold Rush" charted at numbers three, 24, 29 and 34 on the Top40 Singles chart, respectively. In Malaysia, "Willow" and "Champagne Problems" debuted at numbers two and 15, respectively, whereas on the Singaporean Top 30 Singles chart, the tracks entered at the first and 16th spots; "Gold Rush" and "No Body, No Crime" also charted in Singapore.

In many European territories, Evermore attained in its peak multiple weeks after its release. It debuted at number one in Croatia in January 2021, and reached the top spot in Flanders in its sixth week on the Ultratop 200 Albums, after debuting at number two. It marked Swift's fifth consecutive number-one album in the Belgian region. The album peaked at number two on the Irish Albums Chart in its third week. It opened at number three in its debut week, marking Swift's sixth consecutive top-three album in Ireland; it was the most downloaded and streamed album of the week. Simultaneously, "Willow" also placed at number three on Irish Singles Chart, alongside tracks "Champagne Problems" and "No Body, No Crime" at sixth and eleventh spots, respectively, rising Swift's sum of top 50 hits to 38. On the Scottish Albums Chart, Evermore opened at number five, but peaked at number three after 25 weeks. On Germany's Offizielle Top 100, the album opened at number 24, rose to number six the next week, and ascended to number five in June 2021, whereas it topped the Greek Albums Chart in August 2021.

Awards and impact 
Journalists praised Swift's fast-succeeding release of Evermore after Folklore. Variety compared it to similar moves by the Beatles and U2, while Rolling Stone termed it a "hot streak" reminiscent of Prince in 1987 and David Bowie in 1977. Vulture called it a "major shock", as Swift is known for her traditional album roll-outs. Our Culture Mag  and NJ.com welcomed her "artistic dedication", as Swift was also concurrently re-recording her back catalog in 2020. The Sydney Morning Herald named her "the queen of pandemic productivity". The New York Times felt the album was as a crucial moment in Swift's career and creativity. The Guardian and Vox opined that Evermore and Folklore threw emphasis on Swift's work ethic, helped critics recognize her musicianship and view her as a dedicated songstress, moving away from her popstar image in the mid-2010s. Billboard cited the two albums as the most notable examples for how the pandemic veered music in 2020, and forced artists to amend their creative process. CNN and The Times named Swift among the most prominent celebrities of the pandemic. Swift was the world's top paid solo musician of 2020, and the highest paid in the US, thanks to her revenues from Evermore and Folklore, which according to Junkee were "alternative experiments" taken mainstream by Swift's "sheer star power".

At the 2021 American Music Awards, Evermore won the American Music Award for Favorite Pop/Rock Album, as Swift's record-breaking seventh nod and fourth win in the category. Swift was also nominated for Artist of the Year and Favorite Pop/Rock Female Artist, and won the latter for a record-breaking sixth time. At the 64th Annual Grammy Awards, Evermore contended for Album of the Year as Swift's fifth nomination in the category, following Fearless (2008), Red (2012), 1989 (2014) and Folklore.

Croatian singer-songwriter Mia Dimšić named Evermore as an inspiration for writing "Guilty Pleasure", her entry song representing Croatia at the Eurovision Song Contest 2022. American singer-songwriter Christina Perri, regarding her 2022 single "Evergone", told Consequence that Evermore and Folklore influenced her to write heartfelt, melancholic songs as opposed to external expectations for upbeat music. After Evermore, artists such as Gracie Abrams, Ed Sheeran, King Princess and Girl in Red collaborated with Dessner at his Long Pond Studio. Dessner stated, "After Taylor, it was a bit crazy how many people reached out. And getting to meet and write songs with people you wouldn't have had access to... I'm so grateful for it."

Theme park lawsuit 
On February 2, 2021, a theme park in Pleasant Grove, Utah, called Evermore Park, sued Swift and her team for allegedly infringing its "EVERMORE" trademark, seeking to prevent Swift's further use of the word, and demanded "statutory damages of $2 million per counterfeit mark per type of goods or services sold". The park had sent a cease-and-desist letter to Swift on December 29, 2020, to which the singer's team declined to abide, replying "If anything, your client's website traffic has actually increased as a result of the release of Ms. Swift's recent album which, in turn could only serve to enhance your client's mark". The park claimed that the title of Swift's album confuses consumers, negatively affects the park's searchability. According to their court documents, the park's visitors enquired the staff about whether the album was a collaboration between Swift and the park, and that on the day Evermore was announced, the traffic on the park's official website surged by 330 percent in comparison to the previous day, affecting the park's "Google footprint". It also mentioned the park's merchandise and original music on streaming platforms under the "EVERMORE" trademark, claiming Swift's album has made them "harder to find".

Swift's team denied the accusations, referring to the suit as "baseless". Their letter filed in court stated "it is inconceivable that there is any likelihood of confusion between your client's theme park and related products and Ms. Swift's music and related products", and claimed that the park's merchandise—"small dragon eggs, guild patches, and a small dragon mount"—are not similar to the products on Swift's webstore. Speaking to Billboard, Swift's spokesperson called the suit "frivolous" and disputed its "true intent", highlighting a Utah Business report, according to which, the park's founder and CEO Ken Bretschneider "has had at least five lawsuits filed against him and the Evermore group by major construction companies, claiming they are owed between $28,000 and $400,000 in construction, mechanic and landscaping fees. Smaller subcontractors who did work on the park have also filed more than 20 construction liens on the Evermore property".

On February 24, 2021, TAS Rights Management (Swift's copyrights company) countersued the park for allegedly infringing Swift's songs "Love Story", "You Belong with Me" and "Bad Blood" by regularly using them in their performances without a license. TAS claimed that the park "blatantly ignored the numerous notices from BMI and opted instead to continue to benefit from the free and unauthorized public performance of [the songs], despite actual knowledge of the liability and substantial penalties imposed by the Copyright Act to protect artists", and pointed out that Bretschneider reached out to BMI "seeking a retroactive license that would cover all performances from 2018 through 2021" after anticipating a lawsuit from Swift's side.

In March 2021, Swift's spokesperson stated that both parties have resolved to "drop and dismiss their respective suits without monetary settlement".

Track listing 

Notes
  signifies an additional producer.
 All track titles are stylized in all lowercase.

Credits and personnel 
Adapted from Tidal, Pitchfork, and album liner notes.

Musicians 

 Taylor Swift – lead vocals, songwriting, production (2, 3, 6, 15)
 Aaron Dessner –  production (1, 2, 4–17), songwriting (1, 4, 7–14, 16, 17), drum machine programming (1, 4–5, 7, 9–17), percussion (1, 10–12), keyboards (1, 5, 7, 11–12, 16–17), synthesizers (1–2, 4, 6–7, 9–12, 14–17), piano (1–2, 4–8, 11, 13–15, 17), electric guitar (1, 4, 6–12, 16–17), bass guitar (1, 4–10, 12, 14, 16–17), acoustic guitar (1–2, 4, 6–13, 16–17), synth bass (2, 10–13, 17), mandolin (6), field recording (6), tambourine (8), high string guitar (9–10), drum kit (10), rubber bridge guitar (10), drone (13), banjo (16)
 Bryce Dessner – production (9), songwriting (9), orchestration (1, 4–5, 7, 9–17), piano (9, 14), pulse (9), electric guitar (12)
 James McAlister – synthesizers (1, 5, 10, 12, 14), drum machine programming (1, 5, 10, 12), percussion (5), keyboards (5, 10), Vermona pulse (13), drum kit (14, 16)
 Bryan Devendorf – percussion (1, 10, 13), drum machine programming (1, 5, 9–10, 13, 17), drum kit (9, 12)
 Yuki Numata Resnick – violin (1, 4–5, 7, 9–17)
 Clarice Jensen – cello (1, 4, 5, 9–13, 15, 17)
 Jason Treuting – glockenspiel (1), percussion (5, 9, 13), drum kit (9), crotales (12, 15), metal percussion (12), chord stick (13–14, 17)
 Alex Sopp – flute (1, 15)
 CJ Camerieri – French horn (1)
 Thomas Bartlett – keyboard (1, 4, 7, 8, 16–17), synthesizers (1, 4, 7, 8, 10, 17), piano (8, 16–17)
 William Bowery – songwriting (2, 9, 15), piano (15)
 Logan Coale – upright bass (2, 10–11, 14–15)
 Jack Antonoff – production (3), songwriting (3, 10), drums (3), percussion (3), bass (3), electric guitar (3), acoustic guitar (3), slide guitar (3), piano (3), Mellotron (3), backing vocals (3)
 Mikey Freedom Hart – DX7 (3), electric guitar (3), nylon guitar (3), Rhodes (3), celeste (3)
 Sean Hutchinson – drums (3)
 Michael Riddleberger – drums (3)
 Evan Smith – horns (3)
 Patrik Berger – OP-1 (3)
 Bobby Hawk – violin (3)
 Nick Lloyd – Hammond B3 Organ (4, 16)
 Josh Kaufman – harmonium (4, 16), lap steel (4, 6, 11), electric guitar (6, 8, 16), acoustic guitar (8), organ (6), harmonica (6, 11, 16), mandolin (11)
 Benjamin Lanz – trombone (4, 10), horn arrangement (4), modular synthesizer (8, 10)
 Danielle Haim – vocals (6)
 Este Haim – vocals (6)
 JT Bates – drum kit (6–8, 10, 17), percussion (8, 16–17)
 Ryan Olson – Allovers Hi-Hat Generator (7, 13, 17)
 Matt Berninger – vocals (9)
 Scott Devendorf – bass guitar (9), pocket piano (9)
 Justin Vernon – backing vocals (10, 13), triangle (10), drum kit (10–11, 14), banjo (10), electric guitar (10–11, 17), Prophet X (13), Messina (14), synthesizers (15), field recording (15), vocals (15), bass guitar (17), acoustic guitar (17)
 Kyle Resnick – trumpet (10, 12, 14, 17)
 Marcus Mumford – backing vocals (11)
 Marjorie Finlay – backing vocals (13)
 Trever Hagen – trumpet (14), no-input mixer (14)
 BJ Burton – additional production (14)
 James McAlister –  additional production (14)
 Gabriel Cabezas – cello (14–15)
 Dave Nelson – trombone (14, 17)
 Stuart Bogie – alto clarinet (15), contrabass clarinet (15), flute (15)
 Jonathan Low – drum machine programming (16)

Additional instrument recording

 Kyle Resnick – violin (1, 4–5, 7, 9–17)
 Bobby Hawk – violin (3)
 Aaron Dessner – vermona pulse (13)
 Robin Baynton – piano (Bowery on 15)

Technical 

 Taylor Swift – executive producer
 Jonathan Low – recording (1–2, 4–17), vocal recording (1–5; Swift on 6, 9; 10–14; Swift on 15; 17), mixing (all tracks)
 Aaron Dessner – recording (1–2, 4–17)
 Greg Calbi – mastering
 Steve Fallone – mastering
 Laura Sisk – recording (3), vocal recording (8)
 John Rooney – assistant engineering (3)
 Jon Sher – assistant engineering (3)
 Ariel Rechtshaid – vocal recording (Danielle and Este Haim on 6)
 Matt DiMona – vocal recording (Danielle and Este Haim on 6)
 Robin Baynton – vocal recording (7; Swift on 9; Mumford on 11; 16)
 Sean O'Brien – vocal recording (Berninger on 9)
 Justin Vernon – vocal recording (Bon Iver on 15)

Design 
 Beth Garrabrant – photography

Charts

Weekly charts

Year-end charts

Certifications and sales

Release history

See also 
 List of Billboard 200 number-one albums of 2020
 List of Billboard 200 number-one albums of 2021
 List of UK Albums Chart number ones of the 2020s
 List of UK Album Downloads Chart number ones of the 2020s
 List of number-one albums of 2020 (Australia)
 List of number-one albums of 2021 (Australia)
 List of number-one albums of 2020 (Canada)
 List of number-one albums of 2021 (Canada)
 List of number-one albums from the 2020s (New Zealand)
 List of number-one albums of 2021 (Belgium)

Footnotes

References

External links 
 
 

2020 albums
ARIA Award-winning albums
Albums produced by Jack Antonoff
Albums produced by Aaron Dessner
Albums produced by Taylor Swift
Albums impacted by the COVID-19 pandemic
Alternative rock albums by American artists
Chamber pop albums
Folk-pop albums
Folk albums by American artists
Republic Records albums
Surprise albums
Taylor Swift albums
Albums produced by Bryce Dessner